Matilda of Saxony (c. 935-942 – 25 May 1008) was a Saxon aristocrat who became countess of Flanders by marriage to Baldwin III, Count of Flanders.

Life
Matilda was the daughter of Hermann Billung. She first married Baldwin III, count of Flanders, with whom she had one son:

 Arnulf II, Count of Flanders

After Baldwin's death, Matilda married Godfrey I, Count of Verdun, with whom she had several children: 

 Frederick (d. 1022), count of Verdun
 Godfrey (d. 1023), duke of Lower Lorraine (1012–1023)
 Adalberon (d. 988), bishop of Verdun (984–988)
 Herman of Ename (d. 1024), count of Brabant (retired as a monk in the abbey of Verdun abt. 1022)
 Gothelo (d. 1044), margrave of Antwerp, duke of Lower (1023–1044) and later also Upper (1033–1044) Lorraine
 Ermengarde (d. 1042), married Otto of Hammerstein, count in the Wettergau
 Ermentrude, married Arnold de Rumigny (d. 1010), lord of Florennes
 Adela, married Count Godizo of Aspelt.  Their daughter Irmgard married Berthold von Walbeck, son of Lothair I, Margrave of the Nordmark.

Matilda died on 25 May 1008 and was buried in Ghent.

References

Bibliography

House of Billung
Countesses of Flanders
10th-century births
1008 deaths
Daughters of monarchs